The 1949 German football championship, the 39th edition of the competition, was the culmination of the 1948–49 football season in Germany. VfR Mannheim were crowned champions for the first time after a one-leg knock-out tournament. It was both sides' first appearance in the final.

The tournament was expanded so that ten teams were to take part in the final stage which was played as a one-leg knock-out tournament, with the matches played on neutral ground. The five regional Oberliga winners, along with VfR Mannheim and Wormatia Worms, automatically qualified for the quarter finals, while the remaining three teams played qualifying rounds to clinch the eighth place.

The 1949 championship was the first to see a new trophy for the champions awarded. The pre-Second World War trophy, the Viktoria, had disappeared during the final stages of the war and would not resurface until after the German reunification. The new trophy, the Meisterschale, was not ready for the 1948 season but was finished in time to be awarded to the 1949 champions.

Qualified teams
The clubs qualified through the 1948–49 Oberliga season:

Competition

First qualifying round

Second qualifying round

Replay

Quarter-finals

Replays

Semi-finals

Replay

Third place play-off

Final

References

External links
 1948-49 at Weltfussball.de
 Germany - Championship 1949 at RSSSF.com
 German championship 1949 at Fussballdaten.de

1949 in association football
1948–49 in German football
German football championship seasons